Proto-Algic (sometimes abbreviated PAc) is the proto-language from which the Algic languages (Wiyot language, Yurok language, and Proto-Algonquian) are descended. It is estimated to have been spoken about 7,000 years ago somewhere in the American Northwest, possibly around the Columbia Plateau. It is an example of a second-level proto-language (a proto-language whose reconstruction depends on data from another proto-language, namely its descendant language Proto-Algonquian) which is widely agreed to have existed. Its main researcher was Paul Proulx.

Vowels 

Proto-Algic had four basic vowels, which could be either long or short:
long: *i·, *e·, *a·, *o·
short: *i, *e, *a, *o

Consonants 

Proto-Algic had the following consonants:

1 The identity of this consonant is not entirely certain; in Proto-Algonquian, it is sometimes alternatively reconstructed as θ /θ/.

It is unknown if č /tʃ/ was an independent phoneme or only an allophone of c and/or t in Proto-Algic (as in Proto-Algonquian). In 1992, Paul Proulx theorized that Proto-Algic also possessed a phoneme gʷ, which became *w in Proto-Algonquian and g in Wiyot and Yurok.

All stops and affricates in the above chart have aspirated counterparts, and all consonants, except fricatives, have glottalized ones. Proto-Algonquian significantly reduced this system by eliminating all glottalized and aspirated phonemes.

See also 
 Algic languages
 Algonquian languages
 Proto-Algonquian language

References 

 Baldi, Philip, Linguistic Change and Reconstruction Methodology (1990)
 
 
 
 
 
 
 
 
 
 
 
 

Algic languages
Algic